Endoplasmic reticulum mannosyl-oligosaccharide 1,2-alpha-mannosidase is an enzyme that in humans is encoded by the MAN1B1 gene.

References

Further reading